Linda Klein is a registered nurse and an actress. She is also an avid golfer.

She also has a recurring roles as a nurse on the television shows Grey's Anatomy and Nip/Tuck. Her other appearances in television nursing roles include those in Chicago Hope, 24, Boston Public, JAG, Monk, Doogie Howser, MD and Six Feet Under.

She has appeared in several movies as medical roles, including Hard to Kill (1990), and an appearance as a doctor in Very Bad Things. (1998)

Much of her work is done behind the scenes as a medical adviser, and sometimes a producer. Her credits behind the scenes in a medical adviser include Grey's Anatomy, Nip/Tuck, Vanilla Sky, Ocean's Eleven, I Am Sam, City of Angels (TV series), MDs, Bulworth, Nixon, Boys on the Side, Chicago Hope, and many other films and TV shows, dating back to 1983.

Citations

Year of birth missing (living people)
Living people
American nurses
American women nurses
American television actresses
21st-century American women